Taşköprü District is a district of the Kastamonu Province of Turkey. Its seat is the town of Taşköprü. Its area is 1,758 km2, and its population is 37,119 (2021).

Composition
There is one municipality in Taşköprü District:
 Taşköprü

There are 126 villages in Taşköprü District:

 Abay
 Abdalhasan
 Afşar
 Akçakese
 Akdeğirmen
 Akdoğan
 Akdoğantekke
 Akseki
 Alamabatak
 Alamakayış
 Alamaşişli
 Alasökü
 Alatarla
 Alipaşa
 Alisaray
 Armutlu
 Arslanlı
 Aşağıçayırcık
 Aşağıçit
 Aşağıemerce
 Aşağışehirören
 Ayvalı
 Badembekdemir
 Bademci
 Bekdemirekşi
 Bekirli
 Beyköy
 Boyundurcak
 Bozarmut
 Böcü
 Bükköy
 Çambaşı
 Çaycevher
 Çaykirpi
 Çaylaklar
 Çekiç
 Celep
 Çetmi
 Çevik
 Çiftkıran
 Çiftlik
 Çit
 Çördük
 Çoroğlu
 Dağbelören
 Derebeysibey
 Derekaraağaç
 Dereköy
 Dilek
 Donalar
 Doymuş
 Duruca
 Erikköy
 Ersil
 Esenlik
 Eskiatça
 Eskioğlu
 Garipşah
 Gündoğdu
 Güneykalınkese
 Hacıali
 Hamzaoğlu
 Hasanlı
 Hocaköy
 İmamoğlu
 İncesu
 Kabalar
 Kadıköy
 Kapaklı
 Karacakaya
 Karacaoğlu
 Karadedeoğlu
 Karapürçek
 Karnıaçık
 Karşıköy
 Kayadibi
 Kayapınar
 Kaygınca
 Kese
 Kılıçlı
 Kıran
 Kirazcık
 Kırha
 Kızılcaören
 Kızılcaörhen
 Kızılkese
 Koçanlı
 Köçekli
 Kornapa
 Küçüksü
 Kuyluş
 Kuzkalınkese
 Masatlar
 Obrucak
 Olukbaşı
 Ortaköy
 Ortaöz
 Ömerli
 Örhen
 Örhenli
 Oymaağaçseki
 Paşaköy
 Pirahmetli
 Şahinçatı
 Samanlıören
 Sarıkavak
 Sarıseki
 Sarpun
 Şehirören
 Taşçılar
 Tavukçuoğlu
 Tekeoğlu
 Tepedelik
 Tokaş
 Urgancı
 Uzunkavak
 Vakıfbelören
 Yavuç
 Yavuçkuyucağı
 Yazıhamit
 Yeniler
 Yeşilyurt
 Yoğunoluk
 Yukarıçayırcık
 Yukarıemerce
 Yukarışehirören

References

Districts of Kastamonu Province